Sadegh Zharfani is an Iranian football midfielder who plays for Esteghlal Ahvaz in the Iran Pro League.

Club career
Zharfani promoted to Esteghlal Ahvaz first team in summer 2015. He made his professional debut for the club on December 28, 2015 against Saba Qom where he was used as a substitute for Reza Ayyar.

Club career statistics

References

External links
 Sadegh Zahrfani at IranLeague.ir

1996 births
Living people
Association football midfielders
Iranian footballers
Esteghlal Ahvaz players